Eric Brunner (born December 1, 1998) is an American cyclist, who last rode for UCI Continental team .

Major results

Cyclo-cross

2015–2016
 1st US Open of Cyclocross Juniors
 3rd  Pan American Junior Championships
 3rd National Junior Championships
2017–2018
 2nd  Pan American Under-23 Championships
 2nd National Under-23 Championships
2018–2019
 1st Major Taylor Cross Cup II
 2nd  Pan American Under-23 Championships
 3rd National Under-23 Championships
2019–2020
 1st  National Under-23 Championships
 1st US Open of Cyclocross II
 3rd  Pan American Under-23 Championships
2021–2022
 1st  Pan American Championships
 1st  National Championships
 1st New England Cyclocross Series - Really Rad Festival of Cyclocross I & II
 USCX Cyclocross Series
1st Kings CX I
2022–2023
 1st  Pan American Championships
 USPCX Cyclocross
1st Really Rad Festival I
1st Really Rad Festival II
2nd Charm City Cross Day I
3rd Rochester Cyclocross II
 2nd GO Cross I & II

Road
2019
 3rd National Under-23 Criterium Championships

References

External links

1998 births
Living people
American male cyclists
Cyclo-cross cyclists
American cyclo-cross champions
Cyclists from Colorado
Sportspeople from Boulder, Colorado
21st-century American people